The Service Medal (Irish: An Bonn Seirbhíse) is a military decoration of the Republic of Ireland, it is awarded to members of the permanent Defence Forces for 10 years or more of service.

The service medal was instituted on the 13th of December 1944 by the Irish government. The design has remained the same since.

Eligibility 
The 10 year service medal is awarded to all Privates and NCOs for 10 years service.

The 15 Year Service Medal is awarded for completion of a further 5 years service, the ribbon colour is changed to include a gold stripe and a bar is added to the ribbon. Commissioned Officers are awarded this as well, and they receive a bar after 20 years service.

See also 
Military awards and decorations of Ireland

References 

Orders, decorations, and medals of Ireland
Awards established in 1944
1944 establishments in Ireland
Service awards